Staple railway station was a station on the East Kent Light Railway in southeast England, serving the village of Staple. It was located north of the village, on the west side of the road to Durlock, where it crosses over the Wingham River at Durlock Bridge.

The station site is now occupied by a farm.

History
The station opened on 16 October 1916 and the last passenger train ran on 30 October 1948.  There was a windpump supplying the water tower, a passing loop and four sidings. During World War Two, a large munitions dump was set up at Staple and a large calibre rail mounted gun stabled there. The windpump was demolished in June 1950.

References

Sources

External links
 

Disused railway stations in Kent
Former East Kent Light Railway stations
Railway stations in Great Britain opened in 1916
Railway stations in Great Britain closed in 1948